Schefflerodendron usambarense is a species of legume in the family Fabaceae. It is found in Democratic Republic of the Congo, Gabon, and Tanzania.

References

Millettieae
Flora of the Democratic Republic of the Congo
Flora of Gabon
Flora of Tanzania
Least concern plants
Taxonomy articles created by Polbot